Athysanus  may refer to:
 Athysanus (insect), a bug genus in the subfamily Deltocephalinae
 Athysanus (plant), a plant genus in the family Brassicaceae
 Pleistodontes athysanus, a fig wasp species native to Australia